RYB (red–yellow–blue) is a historical set of colors used in subtractive color mixing and is one commonly used set of primary colors.

RYB may also refer to:
 RYB Education, Chinese company
 Staroselye Airport, IATA airport code RYB, airport in Rybinsk, Yaroslavl, Russia
 Royal Bahrain Airlines, ICAO airline code RYB, see List of airline codes (R)
 Roy Bridge railway station, rail station code RYB, railway station in Roybridge, Highland, Scotland, United Kingdom